Paolo Cozzi (born 26 May 1980 in Milan) is a volleyball player from Italy, who won the silver medal with the Italian men's national team at the 2004 Summer Olympics in Athens, Greece.

State awards

 2004  Officer's Order of Merit of the Italian Republic

References
 CONI profile

1980 births
Living people
Italian men's volleyball players
Volleyball players at the 2004 Summer Olympics
Olympic volleyball players of Italy
Olympic silver medalists for Italy
Sportspeople from Milan
Olympic medalists in volleyball
Medalists at the 2004 Summer Olympics